Michael Posluns (1941 - January 10, 2020) was a journalist and researcher in Canada. While a student at Carleton University, Posluns got involved in social justice issues, later joining the Company of Young Canadians. He went to Akwesasne where he worked with Rarihokwats and Ernie Benedict, helping to publish Akewsasne Notes, a local newspaper that ran from 1969-1996. He also became a self-trained court worker, assisting locals to navigate the legal system. In the mid-1970s, he served as a parliamentary adviser to the National Indian Brotherhood (known today as the Assembly of First Nations), working with George Manuel. He also worked with the Dene Nation and others on governance, land claims, mercury poisoning and other issues. Posluns completed a PhD at York University in 2002 and his dissertation is titled The Public Emergence of the Vocabulary of First Nations Self-Government. He was the author of numerous other articles and books and he was co-author with George Manuel of 'The Fourth World: An Indian Reality' (1974) and with David Nahwegahbow and Douglas Sanders of 'The First Nations and the Crown: A Study in Trust Relationships' (1983). Posluns was an important figure in raising the profile of indigenous rights in Canada. He worked closely with George Manuel to advance self-government and indigenous political rights and their work had significant impact on the work of future political actors. In speaking to The Globe and Mail in 2013 Posluns cited some of his early advocacy work in the 1970s involved changing the language the government used to refer to indigenous peoples. For example members of Canadian parliament would refer to activist Kahnitenata Horn as a "Mohawk princess," demonstrating an ignorance of the democratic governance structures of the Haudenosaunee Confederacy. Posluns continued to advocate on issues related to governance and challenging myths and problematic language related to indigenous peoples of Canada, writing opinion columns and policy statements up to 2013. He retired from this work in 2014 due to illness. He died on January 10, 2020.

Works
Manuel, George; Posluns, Michael (2019) The fourth world: an Indian reality. Minneapolis: University of Minnesota Press, 2019. .

References

External links
Michael Posluns archives  at the Clara Thomas Archives and Special Collections, York University Libraries, Toronto, Ontario

York University alumni
1941 births
Journalists from Ontario
2020 deaths